Austria is scheduled to compete at the 2024 Summer Olympics in Paris from 26 July to 11 August 2024. It will be the nation's twenty-ninth appearance at the Summer Olympics.

Competitors
The following is the list of number of competitors in the Games.

Swimming

Austrian swimmers achieved the entry standards in the following events for Paris 2024 (a maximum of two swimmers under the Olympic Qualifying Time (OST) and potentially at the Olympic Consideration Time (OCT)):

References

External links

2024
Nations at the 2024 Summer Olympics
2024 in Austrian sport